Kang Bong-hun is a politician of the Democratic People's Republic of Korea (North Korea). He is a member of the Party Central Committee and Chagang Province Provincial Party Committee Secretary since April 2019.

Biography
In May 2016, during the 7th Congress of the Workers' Party of Korea he was elected as a candidate member of the Central Committee of the Workers' Party of Korea. In April 2019, he was elected as a member of the Central Committee of the Workers' Party of Korea as well as Chagang Province Provincial Party Committee Secretary, replacing Kim Jae-ryong. who was appointed to the Premier of North Korea.

References

Living people
1956 births
Members of the 8th Central Committee of the Workers' Party of Korea